Give Me Light is the fourth studio album by the German gothic metal band Darkseed. It was released in 1999, with Nuclear Blast.

Track listing
 "Dancing with the Lion" – 03:12
 "Cold" – 03:58
 "Echoes of Tomorrow" – 03:06
 "Cosmic Shining" – 04:49 
 "Journey to the Spirit World" – 03:04 
 "Give Me Light" – 05:40  
 "Fusion" – 02:42  
 "Flying Together" – 03:24 
 "Echoes of Tomorrow (Acoustic Version)" – 03:04 
 "Spiral of Mystery" – 04:00
 "Desire" – 01:39

Lineup
Stefan Hertrich – Vocals, programming
Thomas Herrmann – Guitars
Tom Gilcher – Guitars
Rico Galvagno – Bass
Willi Wurm – Drums

Guest Musicians:
Doris Zweimüller – Female Vocals
Gabriel Isuku – Percussion – Gabriel Isuku

External links
Encyclopaedia Metallum
Darkseed Official Site 

Darkseed (band) albums
Nuclear Blast albums
1999 albums